Real Sex is a documentary television series broadcast on and a production of HBO. As its name implies, Real Sex is a sexually explicit "magazine" which "explores sex '90s style."

Real Sex explores human sexuality. Gary R. Edgerton and Jeffrey P. Jones described the fare in The Essential HBO Reader as "a peek into the diversity of sexual activities...with an emphasis that ranges from the unusual to the bizarre."  The show typically explores three to four topics each episode. Segments are separated by street interviews with random people, relating to the episode's topics.

Older episodes as well as "best-of" episodes are frequently re-aired during late nights on HBO.

It spawned a spin-off series called Pornucopia.

Episode guide

See also
 Sexual Secrets
 Sexcetera

References

Further reading

External links
 

1990s American documentary television series
1990 American television series debuts
2000s American documentary television series
2010s American documentary television series
Documentary films about sexuality
Nudity in television
Erotic television series
HBO original programming
English-language television shows